The Dark Tower: The Gunslinger - The Way Station is a five-issue comic book limited series published by Marvel Comics. It is the ninth comic book miniseries based on Stephen King's The Dark Tower series of novels. It is plotted by Robin Furth, scripted by Peter David, and illustrated by Laurence Campbell and Richard Isanove. Stephen King is the Creative and Executive Director of the project. The first issue was published on December 14, 2011.

Publication dates
Issue #1: December 14, 2011
Issue #2: January 11, 2012
Issue #3: February 15, 2012
Issue #4: March 28, 2012
Issue #5: April 25, 2012

Collected editions
The entire five-issue run of The Way Station was collected into a hardcover edition, released by Marvel on June 27, 2012. A paperback edition was later released on July 30, 2013. The series was also included in the hardcover release of The Dark Tower: The Gunslinger Omnibus on September 3, 2014.

See also
The Dark Tower (comics)

References

External links

Dark Tower Official Site

2011 comics debuts
Gunslinger - Way Station, The